Aleksandr Vladimirovich Perov (born 9 July 1978) is a Russian professional football coach and a former player who works as a goalkeeping coach with FC Kuban-2 Krasnodar.

He made his debut in the Russian Premier League in 2004 for FC Kuban Krasnodar.

References

1978 births
Sportspeople from Krasnodar
Living people
Russian footballers
FC Kuban Krasnodar players
FC Salyut Belgorod players
FC Chernomorets Novorossiysk players
FC Krasnodar players
Russian Premier League players
Association football goalkeepers
FC Mashuk-KMV Pyatigorsk players